Boletus siculus is a pored mushroom of the family Boletaceae. The European species was described as new to science in 1869 by Italian botanist Giuseppe Inzenga.

See also
 List of Boletus species

References

External links

siculus
Fungi described in 1869
Fungi of Europe